Pommereulla is a genus of Indian and Sri Lankan plants in the grass family. The only known species is Pommereulla cornucopiae, native to Sri Lanka and Tamil Nadu. The genus is dedicated to Elizabeth Jullienne du Gage de Pommereul (1733-1782), a French female botanist.

formerly included
see Melanocenchris 
 Pommereulla monoeca – Melanocenchris monoica
 Pommereulla royleana – Melanocenchris jacquemontii

References

Chloridoideae
Flora of the Indian subcontinent
Flora of Sri Lanka
Flora of Tamil Nadu
Monotypic Poaceae genera